Garr Michael King (January 28, 1936 – February 5, 2019) was a lawyer and United States district judge of the United States District Court for the District of Oregon.

Education and career

King was born on January 28, 1936 in Pocatello, Idaho. He moved to Salt Lake City, Utah at a young age and served in the Marine Corps from 1954 to 1957 after high school. He spent one year stationed in Japan.

After attending the University of Utah, he received a Bachelor of Laws from Northwestern School of Law of Lewis & Clark College in 1963. He was a Deputy district attorney of District Attorney's Office Multnomah County, Oregon from 1963 to 1966. He was in private practice of law in Portland, Oregon at Morrison and Bailey from 1966 to 1973.  In 1973, he formed a law partnership with Jack L. Kennedy, who he had met at Northwestern School of Law of Lewis & Clark College, and was selected for a judgeship in 1998.  King was president of the Multnomah Bar Association from 1975 to 1976.

Federal judicial service

King was a United States District Judge of the United States District Court for the District of Oregon. King was nominated by President Bill Clinton on October 8, 1997, to a seat vacated by Helen J. Frye. He was confirmed by the United States Senate on April 27, 1998, and received commission on April 30, 1998. He assumed senior status on January 30, 2009, and was succeeded by Judge Marco A. Hernandez. He died on February 5, 2019.

Notable cases

United States vs. Mohamed Osman Mohamud 

King presided over the trial of Mohamed Osman Mohamud, a Somali-American student arrested by the FBI in a 2010 sting, after he tried to set off what he thought was a bomb at a tree-lighting ceremony at Pioneer Courthouse Square in Portland.

A jury found Mohamud guilty in 2013, and King imposed a 30-year prison sentence in 2014.

Al-Haramain Islamic Foundation vs. United States Department of Treasury 

King presided over the lawsuit filed by Al-Haramain Islamic Foundation of Oregon, based in Ashland, against the U.S. Treasury Department. The Treasury froze the assets of the charity after listing it as a "specially designated global terrorist organization" in 2004.  King ruled in favor of Al-Haramain Islamic Foundation, saying that it failed to receive adequate notice of the characterization and did not have a chance to challenge it.

King also expressed frustration at the U.S. government's actions, saying:

References

External links

1936 births
2019 deaths
People from Pocatello, Idaho
University of Utah alumni
Lewis & Clark Law School alumni
Judges of the United States District Court for the District of Oregon
United States district court judges appointed by Bill Clinton
20th-century American judges
21st-century American judges